was a district located in Ishikari Subprefecture, Hokkaido, Japan.

As of 2004, the district had an estimated population of 2,592 and a density of 8.85 persons per km2. The total area was 292.84 km2.

Former towns and villages
 Atsuta

Mergers
 On October 1, 2005, the village of Atsuta, along with the village of Hamamasu (from Hamamasu District), was merged into the expanded city of Ishikari.

Former districts of Hokkaido